Elizabeth "Lisa" McIntosh, OAM (born 16 December 1982) is an Australian Paralympian athlete with cerebral palsy, who competes mainly in sprint events.

Personal
McIntosh was born in the Melbourne suburb of Sandringham on 16 December 1982. She has cerebral palsy which affects her left side. She works as a swimming instructor and lives in the Melbourne suburb of Beaconsfield.

Career

McIntosh first competed for Australia in 1998. At the 2000 Sydney Games, she won three gold medals in the women's 100 m – T38, women's 200 m – T38 and women's 400 m – T38 events, for which she received a Medal of the Order of Australia,. She was named the 2000 Junior Female Paralympian of the Year. At the 2004 Athens Games, she won a silver medal in the women's 200 m – T37 event and a bronze medal in the women's 100 m – T37 event, and finished fifth in the women's 400 m – T38 event. despite recovering from a stress fracture in her left foot. At the 2008 Beijing Paralympics, she won two gold medals in the women's 100 m – T37 and women's 200 m – T37 events. She holds the world record for 100 m, 200 m and 400 m T37. She was named the 2008 Female Paralympian of the Year.

At the IPC Athletics World Championships, she won gold medals in women's 100 m and 200 m T37 events at both the 2002 Lille and 2006 Assen competitions. At the 2006 Melbourne Commonwealth Games, she won a gold medal in the Women's 100 m – T37 event. She was an Australian Institute of Sport athletics scholarship holder in 2003.  
She is taking a break to consider her future in athletics.

References

External links
 Elizabeth 'Lisa' McIntosh at Australian Athletics Historical Results
 

1982 births
Living people
Athletes (track and field) at the 2000 Summer Paralympics
Athletes (track and field) at the 2004 Summer Paralympics
Athletes (track and field) at the 2006 Commonwealth Games
Athletes (track and field) at the 2008 Summer Paralympics
Medalists at the 2000 Summer Paralympics
Medalists at the 2004 Summer Paralympics
Medalists at the 2008 Summer Paralympics
Medallists at the 2006 Commonwealth Games
Australian female sprinters
Paralympic athletes of Australia
Paralympic gold medalists for Australia
Paralympic silver medalists for Australia
Paralympic bronze medalists for Australia
Paralympic medalists in athletics (track and field)
Commonwealth Games gold medallists for Australia
Commonwealth Games medallists in athletics
World record holders in Paralympic athletics
Cerebral Palsy category Paralympic competitors
Track and field athletes with cerebral palsy
Australian Institute of Sport Paralympic track and field athletes
Recipients of the Medal of the Order of Australia
Sportswomen from Victoria (Australia)
Athletes from Melbourne
People from Sandringham, Victoria